Village of Edgewood Historic District is a national historic district located in Lower Makefield Township, Bucks County, Pennsylvania.  The district includes 28 contributing buildings in the crossroads village of Edgewood. They include a variety of residential, commercial, and institutional buildings, some of which are representative of the Late Victorian style. Notable buildings include the Presbyterian Congregation of Newtown chapel (1881), Grange Hall (1921), Tomlinson's Store (early 19th century), Heston Hall (c. 1830), Biles' House (1790), Biles' Corner (c. 1750), Flowers' House and outbuildings (early- to mid-19th century), and Old Shade tavern (1765, c. 1796-1799).

It was added to the National Register of Historic Places in 1980.

References

Historic districts in Bucks County, Pennsylvania
Historic districts on the National Register of Historic Places in Pennsylvania
National Register of Historic Places in Bucks County, Pennsylvania
Victorian architecture in Pennsylvania